Constitución railway station is a large railway station in Constitución, a  in central Buenos Aires, Argentina. The ground floor of the station has fourteen tracks and the floor below has two tracks for the Buenos Aires Underground.

In 2021, the station received the heritage designation of National Historic Monument.

History

On 7 March 1864, in a ceremony attended by the president Bartolomé Mitre, construction began at Mercado Constitución, on the site of the present day terminus, as the British-owned Buenos Aires Great Southern railway company began building its first broad gauge line of 114 km as far as Chascomús.  The first section of the line to Jeppener, Buenos Aires, was opened on 14 August 1865; during that same month a small terminal station at Mercado Constitución was opened to the public and renamed Plaza Constitución.  Later that year in December the line to Chascomús was opened.

This first building, known as "Constitución I", was a simple construction whose façade was on the current Brazil Street, facing the Mercado Constitución. Public access entered from one side. This primitive terminal had only two platforms: one for arrivals and one for departure of trains.

Between 1885 and 1887 the Plaza Constitución terminus was rebuilt and enlarged and between 1906 and 1907 further building work was carried out and extra platforms were added to cope with the increasing suburban traffic.  In 1912 yet more platforms were added.

On 19 September 1925 a foundation stone for the present day terminus was laid by the Prince of Wales, later Duke of Windsor, during his official visit to Argentina. The original station was then rebuilt with fourteen platforms roofed over, modern hydraulic buffer stops and an imposing concourse which formed a massive main hall, one of the largest in the world, along the entire length of the site.  Of the fourteen platforms, only two or three were normally used for mainline trains, leaving the rest for suburban services.  To the east of the main station a large goods and parcels section with warehouses, offices and several sidings was built. The street frontage of the original station was left untouched due to financial constraints imposed towards the end of the rebuilding.

The station was the site of a riot on May 16, 2007, during the evening rush hour, which provoked debate and discussion in Argentina about railway privatisation. A crowded train broke down within walking distance of the station blocking the railway and the irate passengers from trains trapped at the station, after waiting for the train to be fixed and to move, walked to the platform, thus triggering the chaos. Around 25 people were injured, and a total of 16 were arrested and later released.

Operation

All southbound trains on the Roca Line have their terminus at Constitución and the station is served by Trenes Argentinos, the national train operator which provides commuter services through the Roca Line to the nearby city of La Plata and to the surrounding suburbs of Buenos Aires.

Trenes Argentinos also operates long-distance services throughout much of Buenos Aires Province on the General Roca Railway, formerly operated by defunct company Ferrobaires. Major destinations include Mar del Plata, Miramar, and Bahía Blanca, with connecting services further south to Carmen de Patagones.

Constitución is accessible by the Line C of the Buenos Aires Underground and by numerous public bus services (including the colectivo 60 service), and by long-distance bus services. From 1944 to 1966, it was also served by Line E with a station there, however this was closed when the line was re-routed further towards the centre of the city. In the future, the station will also serve as the terminus for Line F which began construction in 2015.

The surrounding neighbourhood - part of Neighbourhood of Constitución - is characterised by low-rent residences for people from the provinces (or from neighbouring Paraguay and Bolivia) who come to work in the city.

In media 
Several films have been filmed at the station, the most important of which are There Be Dragons and On Probation. Also several novels take place in the station and its surroundings.

Gallery

See also

 Constitución - Line C underground station
 Constitución - Line E underground ghost station
 Line F (Buenos Aires Underground) - planned line that will also connect to the station

Bibliography
 H.R.Stones, British Railways in Argentina 1860-1948, P.E.Waters & Associates, Bromley, Kent, England, 1993.
 D.S.Purdom, British Steam on the Pampas, Mechanical Engineering Publications Ltd, London, 1977.

References

External links

Trenes Argentinos, operator

Railway stations in Buenos Aires
Railway stations opened in 1907